Ganter is a surname. Notable people with the surname include:

Allan Ganter (born 1938), Australian figure skater
Amy Kim Ganter (born 1980), American comics artist
Bernard J. Ganter (1928–1993), American Roman Catholic bishop
Emil Ganter, Swiss footballer

See also
 Canter (surname)
 Cantor (surname)
 Caunter, surname
 Kanter, surname
 Kantor (surname)

Occupational surnames